List of radio stations in the Ashanti region of Ghana in no particular order.

List of radio stations

See also 

 Media of Ghana
 List of newspapers in Ghana
 List of radio stations in Ghana
 Telecommunications in Ghana
 New Media in Ghana

References 

 
 
 
 
 
 
 
 
 
 

Ashanti
Ashanti Region